Tsend-Ayush Naranjargal (Mongolian: Цэнд-Аюушын Наранжаргал) is a female Mongolian judoka. She competed at the 2016 Summer Olympics in the women's 70 kg event, in which she was eliminated in the first round by Esther Stam.

Judo career 
Won the 2007 Asian Junior 57kg class. At the 2009 East Asian Games , she finished 3rd in the 70kg division and 2nd in the open division. After she won the 2010 Asian Juniors, she finished third at the Asian Games. She finished 3rd at the 2011 Asian Championships and she finished 2nd at the World Junior Championships. She finished third at the Asian Championships and the Grand Slam Moscow in 2012, but she missed out on the London Olympics because she was not in the top 14 world rankings for Olympic qualification. She finished second at the 2013 Asian Championships. In 2014 she won the East Asian Championships. In the finals of the Grand Prix Ulaanbaatar held in her hometown, she was defeated by South Korea's Hwang Yeo - seong . Became. She then held the IJFAt the seminar, armpits in this match were taken up as a case of extremely malicious fouls that can no longer be called sports. Although he lost in the first match at the world championship , he finished second in the world group. He finished 3rd at the Asian Games and won the 2015 Asian Championships. In the team match, in the first match against Japan, Nun- Ira Karen again tried to consolidate the foul, but this time  foul loss was applied . She lost her opening match at the 2016 Rio de Janeiro Olympics. She finished third in three consecutive Asian Games in 2018.

In 2014, she finished third in the 72kg class at  Sambo World Championships.

Mixed Martial Arts career 
After going 2–0 on the regional scene, winning the bouts via first round submission and TKO stoppage, Tsend-Ayush faced Amanda Leve on February 3, 2023 at PFL Challenger Series 10, where she would lose the bout via unanimous decision.

Mixed martial arts record

|-
|Loss
|align=center|2–1
|Amanda Leve
|Decision (unanimous)
|PFL Challenger Series 10
|
|align=center|3 
|align=center|5:00
|Orlando, Florida, United States
| 
|-
|Win
|align=center|2–0
|Cheyanne Bowers
|Submission (scarf hold armbar)
|LFA 144
|
|align=center|1
|align=center|3:23
|Sioux Falls, South Dakota, United States
|
|-
|Win
|align=center|1–0
|Tsogzolmaa Dorjsuren
|TKO (punches)
|Mongol FC Fight Night 4
|
|align=center|1
|align=center|1:50
|Ulaanbaatar, Mongolia
|

References

External links
 
  Tsend-Ayush Naranjargal at The-Sports.org

1992 births
Living people
Mongolian female judoka
Judoka at the 2016 Summer Olympics
Olympic judoka of Mongolia
Asian Games medalists in judo
Judoka at the 2010 Asian Games
Judoka at the 2014 Asian Games
Judoka at the 2018 Asian Games
Asian Games bronze medalists for Mongolia
Medalists at the 2018 Asian Games
Medalists at the 2014 Asian Games
Medalists at the 2010 Asian Games
20th-century Mongolian women
21st-century Mongolian women
Mongolian female mixed martial artists
Mixed martial artists utilizing judo
Mixed martial artists utilizing sambo
Mongolian sambo practitioners